Roman Kofman (born 15 June 1936) is a Ukrainian composer, conductor, music educator and People's Artist of Ukraine (2003). Kofman was awarded the Order of Merit of the Federal Republic of Germany in 2008 and is the winner of the ECHO Klassik Prize (2007). He was nominated and entered the short list of Shevchenko National Prize in 2011.

Since 1990 he is the Principal Conductor of the Kyiv Chamber Orchestra of the National Philharmonic of Ukraine.

Biography 
Roman Kofman was born on 15 June 1936 in Kyiv, Ukraine. He graduated from the State Conservatory (now The Tchaikovsky National Academy of Music) with a degree in violin (1961), followed by a degree in conducting in 1971. Since 1963 he worked as a concertmaster of the Kyiv Chamber Orchestra. As a conductor he performed with more than 70 orchestras from Europe, America, Asia and Africa (including WDR Symphony Orchestra Cologne, Bern Symphony Orchestra, Orchestra of the Bavarian Radio, Munich Philharmonic and others).

In 2003–2008 he worked in Germany as a music director at the Beethoven Orchester Bonn.

Kofman is currently a professor of conducting at the National Music Academy of Ukraine.

References

External links 
 Kyiv Chamber Orchestra on the website of National Philharmonic of Ukraine 
 Roman Kofman Interview on General-Anzeiger 

Ukrainian conductors (music)
Male conductors (music)
Ukrainian music educators
Ukrainian classical violists
Kyiv Conservatory alumni
Academic staff of Kyiv Conservatory
Officers Crosses of the Order of Merit of the Federal Republic of Germany
1936 births
Living people
21st-century conductors (music)
21st-century male musicians
21st-century violists